Olnut or Ernut is a district of the old Armenian region of Taron.

See also
List of regions of ancient Armenia

Former regions of Armenia